Eden Fesi, also known as Manifold, is a fictional, mutant superhero appearing in American comic books published by Marvel Comics. Created by Jonathan Hickman and Stefano Caselli, the character first appeared in Secret Warriors #4 (July 2009), and joined that comic's regular cast. Fesi is an Aboriginal Australian mutant with the ability to bend time and space, connecting one piece to another and allowing him to teleport. Fesi joined the Avengers as a part of the Marvel NOW! relaunch. In 2013, ComicsAlliance ranked Manifold as #12 on their list of the "50 Sexiest Male Characters in Comics".

Publication history
Eden Fesi first appeared in Secret Warriors #4 (July 2009), and was created by writer Jonathan Hickman and artist Stefano Caselli. He appeared in the book until its conclusion in issue #28 (September 2011). He also made guest appearances as a member of the Secret Warriors in Dark Avengers #9 (November 2009), New Avengers #62 (April 2010), and Siege #2-3 (April–May 2010).

Fesi, as Manifold, appears as a member of Hickman's Avengers, beginning with Avengers vol. 5, #1 (December 2012), a part of the Marvel NOW! relaunch. Hickman said that, when creating the character, he had initially intended to give him the codename "Calabi–Yau", named after a Calabi–Yau manifold, but when adding the character to the Avengers roster he decided on the codename "Manifold" instead.

Fictional character biography
Eden Fesi, a mutant teleporter living in Kata Tjuta, Australia under the tutelage of Gateway, is recruited by Nick Fury to be a part of his Secret Warriors. Hesitant at first, he agrees when Gateway gives his blessing. Almost immediately after being recruited, Eden has to teleport the entire team into the middle of a large battle aboard a dock to save Fury. He accompanies the team on several missions, including an infiltration of the H.A.M.M.E.R. base that brings them into conflict with the Dark Avengers and an attack on a HYDRA base that leaves Eden critically wounded. The team disbands, as Hellfire had betrayed them and Eden slips into a coma. Eden eventually makes a full recovery.

As part of the Marvel NOW! event, Eden is now operating under the moniker Manifold. He is recruited by Captain America and Iron Man to the Avengers, as a part of their attempt to make the team more global in scope. As part of the Avengers, he encounters the Guardians of the Galaxy when the latter team is ambushed and nearly slain by mysterious aliens.

During the Secret Wars storyline, Black Panther prepares Manifold for his task which calls on him to sacrifice himself to teleport other heroes to the safety of Mister Fantastic's lifeboat. Manifold teleports other superheroes like Spider-Man and Star-Lord to Mister Fantastic's lifeboat. When mutants founded the island nation of Krakoa, Manifold was subsequently recruited to the island's space program - the latest incarnation of S.W.O.R.D. - as the 'Quintician', one of 'The Six', and leader of the Teleport Team.

During Destiny of X, Eden Fesi tells Cable he is leaving the S.W.O.R.D team.

Powers and abilities
Eden's mutation allows him to bend reality, folding and twisting space-time. Daisy Johnson described him as a "souped-up teleporter". Eden's portals stay open until he chooses to close them. It was recently revealed that Eden actually talks to space. Abigail Brand reported that Eden asks space to do things for him, such as fold so he can walk across and essentially teleport, or he can ask space to bend light around him rendering him invisible.

Other versions
In an unnamed alternate reality, Caucasian version of Manifold (wearing the same costume as Eden) appears in Wakanda alongside the villainess Black Swan. Black Swan later kills this Manifold after his teleportation abilities cease to function. In the following issue, she refers to her actions as a mercy killing, stating that a Manifold is unable to use his or her abilities once they leave their own universe.

In other media

Television
 Eden is alluded to in the television series Agents of S.H.I.E.L.D., in the episode "The Inside Man". While the team is spying on the various foreign delegations, it is revealed that the Australian government has Eden in their possession. He is said to be an Inhuman instead of being a mutant.

Video games
 Eden Fesi's Manifold appearance appears in Marvel Heroes.

References

External links
 
 
 World of Black Heroes: Eden Fesi Biography

Australian superheroes
Avengers (comics) characters
Characters created by Jonathan Hickman
Comics characters introduced in 2009
Fictional people from the Northern Territory
Marvel Comics characters who can teleport
Marvel Comics mutants
Marvel Comics superheroes